Jen Jis (aka Antoine Chatenet) is a French producer and songwriter.

Based in Paris, Chatenet began his professional career writing and composing tracks for European artists. At the same time, he toured in China, Europe, US, and Canada with several other projects.

Chatenet created a global commercial sync for the perfume "Les Cascades de Rochas". After taking part in over 300 concerts, he returned from Asia, and as Jen Jis began working in his studio with dance music artists Point Point, Birdy Nam Nam, and Ed Banger DJs).

After a few months, Jen Jis travelled to Los Angeles, where he met many producers and worked on music with Jordan Young, a mixer and producer for The Chainsmokers, Oliver Heldens and Beyonce), to develop musical techniques suitable for the US market.

In 2018 Jen Jis came back to Europe, and teamed up with Feder (multi platinum DJ/producer based in France) in order to produce and release ‘Keep Us Apart’. He produced, songwrote and mixed for the Black Eyed Peas and Feder (his remix of Rita Ora). With Ofenbach he co-produced a number of singles and remixes for themselves and for Clean Bandit, Lauv and Anne Marie.

After signing a brand new deal with Spinnin, he released a single ‘These Boots are Made for Walking’ featuring the grammy nominated multi-platinum singer Melody Gardot. After this first collaboration they recorded a new track "Little Something" with Sting, released in 2020.

List of works

Released on his own 

 2016: Freia - Call My Name (Jen Jis remix)
 2016: Jen Jis - Women (feat. Lawrence Léa)
 2017: Urban Cone - Old School (Jen Jis remix), 2015
 2017: Jen Jis - 24 Hours Ago
 2018: Haevn - Back In The Water (Jen Jis remix)
 2018: Mylene Farmer - Rolling Stone (Jen Jis remix)
 2018: Ofenbach - Paradise (Jen Jis remix)
 2018: Jen Jis & Feder - Keep Us Apart (feat. Bright Sparks)
 2018: The Parakit - Dam Dam (Jen Jis remix)
 2019: Feder - Control (Jen Jis Remix)
 2019: Jen Jis - These Boots Are Made For Walking (feat. Melody Gardot)

Works for other artist 

 2016: Joris Delacroix - Young and Brave (Rework / Ana Zimmer Edit)
 2017: Ginkgoa - Boy Bounce
 2018: Ginkgoa - One Time
 2018: Clean Bandit & Demi Lovato - Solo (Ofenbach remix)
 2019: Ofenbach - Rock It (certified gold in France) / Terrified / Paradise (certified gold in France)
 2019: Lauv - fuck i'm lonely (feat. Anne-Marie) (Ofenbach remix)
 2019: Ofenbach - Insane
 2019: Rita Ora - Only Want You (Feder remix)
 2020: The Parakit - Nova Girl
 2020: L'August - Viens On Bouge / Minuit sur le Tel / 3 pour Moi / Thème Pauvre
 2020: Dua Lipa - Physical (Ofenbach remix)
 2020: Melody Gardot & Sting - Little Something

References 

Year of birth missing (living people)
Living people
French record producers
Spinnin' Records artists
Remixers
French songwriters
French dance musicians